Recipe Unlimited Corporation is a Canadian company that operates several restaurant chains such as Swiss Chalet, Harvey's and The Keg, and food distribution for large operations. 

The company was originated in 1883 as Canada Railway News Company that sold newspapers, magazines and confectioneries before moving to the restaurant business. The present company dates to 1961, as Canada Railway News Co. merged with Aero Caterers Limited, founded in 1941 as an airline catering service, to form Cara Operations Limited and the company went public in 1968. The company adopted its present name in May 2018 and its headquarters are in Vaughan, Ontario, a suburb north of Toronto within the Greater Toronto Area.

History 
The company was originally chartered in 1883 as Canada Railway News Company, selling newspapers, magazines and confectionaries at railway stations. The company's roots go back to the mid-1850s, when Thomas Patrick Phelan was selling apples and newspapers to train passengers on the Niagara Steamboats. Canada Railway News soon moved into the food business, catering to a boom in passenger rail traffic in Canada. Then, in the 1930s, the company began offering catering services to the airlines and by 1941, Aero Caterers Limited was launched. By 1951, it was serving about 1,500 meals a day.

In 1961, the company merged Canada Railway News Company and Aero Caterers and changed its name to Cara Operations Limited. The name Cara was derived from the first two letters of each of the words "Canada Railway".

Cara was owned solely by the Phelan family from its inception in 1883 until it went public in 1968. At that time, its primary business was catering to the transportation sector (airline and rail meals), but it did operate restaurants and coffee shops in various office towers and airport terminals in Canada. Total sales of all the various operations was Can$30 million in 1968.

In 1977, Cara Operations purchased Foodcorp Limited in a deal that included restaurants like Swiss Chalet and Harvey's. Cara Operations also went on to purchase Milestones, Montana's, and Kelsey's in 2002. In the same year, sales for the company were Can$1.9 billion. 88% of the business comes from the restaurant services, with the remaining 12% deriving from airline catering.

On February 26, 2004, Cara went private, with the Phelan heiresses buying out the minority for $8 a share or $345 million, after a short battle in which they had offered $7.625 a share for the 46.5% of the company they didn't own. At the time,
Cara fully owned Swiss Chalet, Harvey's, Second Cup, Kelsey's Neighborhood Bar & Grill, and Montana's Cookhouse. It owned as a franchisee Eastern Canadian Outback Steakhouse restaurants.

In 2010, Cara Operations exited the airline catering business with the sale of Cara Airline Solutions.

In 2014, Cara had EBITDA of $84 million on sales of $1.7 billion, but had a 6.4 debt leverage ratio when Bill Gregson assumed the presidency of the firm, because the funds obtained via the sale of non-core-asset had been used, not to pay down debt but instead to expand the business.

In March 2015, Cara IPO was brokered by Fairfax Financial. Through it, the company raised $200 million, and merged in a 7:8 ratio with Fairfax's East Side Mario's, Casey's and the Bier Markt properties. The $200 million represented a 23% stake in the combined business, and the heiresses had in 2015 realised a valuation of roughly $300 million. The services of Bill Gregson were acquired in the deal by the merged company.

In May 2018, then Chief Executive Officer Bill Gregson announced that Cara Operations Limited would be changing its name to Recipe Unlimited Corporation and would be traded under the new stock symbol "RECP".

On October 1, 2018, the company was hit by a malware attack, requiring closure of many of its restaurants in Canada. The attack required some restaurants to continue as cash-only operations until at least the following day.  Some locations were without point-of-sale systems and also without electronic payment methods for almost a week.

On August 9, 2022, Fairfax Financial proposed to take the company private for $954 million. Upon completion of the deal on October 31, 2022, Recipe Unlimited's stock was delisted from the Toronto Stock Exchange.

Labour issues
Beginning October 5, 2015, female employees at all Bier Markt locations were required to wear tight blue mini-dresses, and heels or boots as footwear on the job. The work outfit practice applied to employees at locations in Ontario and Quebec who had previously worn black pants and golf shirt as a uniform. After the CBC investigated complaints of gender discrimination, Cara modified its outfit practice to allow employees to wear the original gender-neutral uniform.

In early 2018, Cara's CEO and President Bill Gregson announced that the recent Ontario minimum wage hike to $14 an hour had not adversely affected revenues, with sales going up throughout most of Ontario.

Acquisitions 
In 1977, Cara purchased FoodCorp Limited which included Swiss Chalet and Harvey's.

In 2002, Cara purchased Kelseys Inc. from owner Paul Jeffery, acquiring Montanas, Kelseys and the Outback (Canada). The rights to Outback steakhouse were owned in Canada by Cara, but it was sold back to Outback in the USA because of high food costs.

In 2013, Cara came to an agreement with Fairfax Financial Holdings Ltd. to make Prime Restaurants a wholly owned subsidiary of Cara. This added restaurants such as Casey's, East Side Mario's, Bier Markt and Prime Pubs to its operations.

In 2014, Cara acquired the Landing Group Restaurants.

On August 31, 2015, Cara announced that it would be acquiring New York Fries. South St. Burger would not be part of the acquisition.

On March 31, 2016, Cara Operations announced that it would acquire St-Hubert Chicken CAD$537 million.

On September 1, 2016, Cara Operations acquired Franworks Group, and its Original Joe's, State & Main, and Elephant & Castle brands.

In 2017, Cara acquired The Pickle Barrel.

In January 2018, Cara Operations merged with The Keg and changes their name to Recipe Unlimited Corporation. The $200M deal closed on February 22, 2018.

In 2021, Recipe Unlimited acquired the controlling interest of Burger's Priest.

Operations

Restaurants
As of 2021, Recipe Unlimited has over 1,300 restaurants within Canada.

Restaurant operations 
 Swiss Chalet
 Kelseys Original Roadhouse
 Montana's BBQ & Bar
 East Side Mario's
 Prime Pubs
 Bier Markt
 The Burger's Priest
 Landing Group
 Casey's Grill & Bar
 Harvey's
 New York Fries
 St-Hubert
 Pickle Barrel
 Original Joe's
 State & Main
 Elephant & Castle
 Taverne Moderne
 The Keg
Fresh Restaurants
Fionn MacCool's

Former restaurants
 Gatineau Brew Works
 Pizza Grillia
 Steak n'Burger
 Toast! Cafe & Grill
 Milestones
 Coza Tuscan Grill

Correctional facilities and prisons
Under their subsidiary Summit Food Services, Cara provided commissary and kitchen services to correctional facilities internationally. Sold by Cara to an investor group in 2007, Summit Food Service Distributors Inc., now a division of Colabor LP, is Canada's largest Canadian-owned broadline distributor to the food service industry.

Airline catering 

Cara Airline Solutions business assets were sold on November 8, 2010, to Gate Gourmet (GateGroup). Before November 8, 2010, Cara controlled 85% of the Canadian airline market, providing meals for more than 60 of the world's major airlines including KLM, American Airlines, British Airways and Air Canada. Meals were prepared at Cara's nine flight kitchens located across Canada.

See also
List of Canadian restaurant chains
List of assets owned by Recipe Unlimited

References

External links 

 
Canadian companies established in 1883
Aircraft ground handling companies
Airline catering
Companies formerly listed on the Toronto Stock Exchange
Companies based in Vaughan
Food and drink companies established in 1883
Food and drink companies of Canada
Restaurant groups in Canada
Foodservice companies
Fairfax Financial